Nebojša Popović (born 28 April 1947 in Prijedor) is a Bosnian Serb former handball player who competed for Yugoslavia in the 1972 Summer Olympics and in the 1976 Summer Olympics.

He was part of the Yugoslav team which won the gold medal at the Munich Games. He played all six matches and scored eleven goals.

Four years later he was a member of the Yugoslav team which finished fifth in the Olympic tournament. He played all six matches and scored fourteen goals.

References
 profile

1947 births
Living people
People from Prijedor
Yugoslav male handball players
Serbian male handball players
Olympic handball players of Yugoslavia
Handball players at the 1972 Summer Olympics
Handball players at the 1976 Summer Olympics
Olympic gold medalists for Yugoslavia
Olympic medalists in handball
Medalists at the 1972 Summer Olympics